"I Wanna Thank Me" is a song by American hip hop recording artist Snoop Dogg. It was released on July 3, 2019, as the first single from his seventeenth studio album of the same name, through Empire Distribution and Doggystyle Records. The song was produced by Battlecat, who also composed the song along with the rapper, it features vocals from Marknoxx.

Composition 
"I Wanna Thank Me" is a west coast hip hop, mid-tempo song that features beats and minor influences of G-funk. The song itself contains a sample of "The Next Episode" by Dr. Dre featuring Snoop Dogg, Kurupt and Nate Dogg, from Dre's album 2001.

Music video 
On July 3, 2019, Snoop uploaded the music video for "I Wanna Thank Me" on his YouTube account. The clip opens with footage of Snoop's acceptance speech during his Hollywood Walk of Fame ceremony in 2018. The music video was directed by Dah Dah.

Release history

References

2019 songs
2019 singles
Snoop Dogg songs
Songs written by Snoop Dogg
Empire Distribution singles
Songs written by Battlecat (record producer)